Elections were held in Zamboanga Peninsula for seats in the House of Representatives of the Philippines on May 13, 2013.

The candidate with the most votes won that district's seat for the 16th Congress of the Philippines.

In Isabela, Basilan, although a part of this region, the voters elect their representative via Basilan's legislative district. Isabela is politically within Basilan despite being in a separate regions.

Summary

Zamboanga City

1st District
Incumbent Maria Isabelle Climaco Salazar did not run for re-election; she ran for the mayorship instead. Incumbent Mayor Celso Lobregat was her party's nominee under the coalition of LDP-LP-AZAP.

The UNA-ZTZ coalition fielded former Monsignor Crisanto dela Cruz for the post. Dela Cruz previously run for the mayorship in 2007 and for the vice-mayorship in 2010. This was the second time where Dela Cruz and Mayor Lobregat went against each other; the previous time was in the 2007 mayoral elections.

2nd District
Incumbent Erico Basilio Fabian was term limited and ran for the mayorship instead. He then formed a local coalition known as Fuerza Zamboanga, yielding District II Councilor Lilia Nuño to replace him.

The AZAP coalition nominated Mayor Lobregat's brother, Jose Lobregat.

The ZTZ coalition recruited former City Vice-Mayor Mannix Dalipe.

Zamboanga del Norte

1st District
Seth Frederick Jalosjos was the incumbent.

2nd District
Rosendo Labadlabad was the incumbent. He faced incumbent governor Rolando Yebes.

3rd District
Incumbent Cesar Jalosjos was term-limited, and Johanna Jalosjos-Parreño was the party's nominee. Former Zamboanga del Norte Governor Isagani S. Amatong ran against Jalosjos-Parreño.

Zamboanga del Sur

1st District
Victor Yu was the incumbent.

2nd District
Aurora Cerilles was the incumbent.

Zamboanga Sibugay

1st District
Incumbent Jonathan Cabilao Yambao did not run; his mother, former representative Belma Cabilao was the party's nominee.

2nd District
Romeo Jalosjos, Jr. was the incumbent.

References

2013 Philippine general election
Lower house elections in the Zamboanga Peninsula